7 Years of Bad Luck is the debut album from North Carolina Hip Hop artist Supastition. The title references his struggles in the music industry. The release was praised for strong lyricism, but criticized for weak production.

Track listing

2002 debut albums
Supastition albums